Pachydermia laevis is a species of sea snail, a marine gastropod mollusk in the family Peltospiridae.

Description
The length of the shell attains 4.6 mm.

Distribution
This marine species was found on the East Pacific Rise at a depth of 2630 m.

References

External links
 Warén A. & Bouchet P. (2001). Gastropoda and Monoplacophora from hydrothermal vents and seeps new taxa and records. The Veliger, 44(2): 116-231

Neomphalidae
Gastropods described in 1989